Dinamo București is a Romanian association football club based in Bucharest. The club was founded in 1948 and spent its entire history in Liga I, the top league of Romanian football

Dinamo is one of the two most successful football teams in Romania, having won 18 Romanian Liga I titles, 13 Romanian Cups and 2 Romanian Supercups. They became the first Romanian team to reach the European Champions' Cup semifinals in 1983–84.

As of the end of the 2020–21 season, the team have spent 72 seasons in the top tier of the Romanian football league system. The table details the team's achievements and the top goalscorer in senior first-team competitions from their first season in 1948–49 to the end of the most recently completed season.

Key 

P = Games played
W = Games won
D = Games drawn
L = Games lost
F = Goals for
A = Goals against
Pts = Points
Pos = Final position

QR = Qualifying Round
R32 = Round of 32
R16 = Round of 16
R1 = Round 1
R2 = Round 2
R3 = Round 3
R4 = Round 4
R5 = Round 5
R6 = Round 6
Grp = Group stage
QF = Quarter-finals
SF = Semi-finals

Seasons
''Correct as of the end of the 2020–21 season. For information on the season in progress, see 2021–22 FC Dinamo București season.

Notes

External links
 Dinamo Bucuresti at labtof.ro
 Dinamo at romaniansoccer.ro
 Dinamo at soccerway.com

  
Dinamo Bucuresti